Charl Francois 'KP' du Plessis (born 8 April 1987) is a former South African professional rugby union player that played domestically for the , ,  and the  and also played Super Rugby with the , making a total of 81 first class appearances between 2008 and 2014. His regular position was prop.

Career

Youth

Du Plessis went to Hoërskool Monument in Krugersdorp, where his performances for his school earned him a selection to the  team that participated at the Under-18 Craven Week competition held in Bloemfontein in 2005. He was also selected in a South Africa Schools 'B' team in the same year.

Golden Lions / UJ / Falcons

He joined the  Academy after high school and played for the  during the 2006 Under-19 Provincial Championship before making the step up to the  team for the 2007 Under-21 Provincial Championship.

In 2008, he was named in university side 's squad for the 2008 Varsity Cup, the inaugural edition of the premier university rugby union competition in South Africa. He made two appearances for UJ in the competition before switching to the  squad for the 2008 Vodacom Cup. He made his first class debut in their match against , coming on for the final few minutes of a 20–6 victory. That was his only involvement in the competition, but he did appear in two more Varsity Cup matches for UJ. In the second half of 2008, he once again played for the s in the Under-21 Provincial Championship.

In the 2009 Varsity Cup, he made a single appearance for UJ before again being involved in the Golden Lions' 2009 Vodacom Cup campaign.

He joined the Golden Lions' near neighbours, Kempton Park-based side  on loan for the duration of the 2009 Currie Cup First Division. Du Plessis featured in eight matches – starting seven of those – in a season to forget for the Falcons, as they lost all ten of their matches in the competition.

He was the undoubted first-choice loosehead prop for  during the 2010 Varsity Cup competition, starting all seven of their matches as UJ finished in fifth position, missing out on a play-off spot. This brought his total number of appearances for the Golden Lions in three seasons of Vodacom Cup rugby to seven, although he never appeared at Currie Cup level for them.

Boland Cavaliers

He came on just after half time and helped his new side to a 53–10 victory.

He made seven appearances for Boland during the 2011 Vodacom Cup competition, offering the side versatility by being able to play as a loosehead or a tighthead prop. Du Plessis featured in nine of the Boland Cavaliers' ten matches during the regular season of the 2011 Currie Cup First Division, with Boland winning nine of those matches to finish top of the log. However, the South African Rugby Union announced that the Premier Division would be reduced from eight teams to six for 2012, meaning that promotion wasn't a possibility for the Cavaliers.

Du Plessis started four matches for the Boland Cavaliers during the 2012 Vodacom Cup, narrowly missing out on qualifying for the semi-finals, finishing behind Argentine side  on points difference only.

Eastern Province Kings

He then moved to the team he faced in two consecutive First Division finals, Port Elizabeth-based , for the 2012 Currie Cup First Division season. The EP Kings topped the log after the regular season and went on to win the competition by beating the  26–25 in the final. This meant that Du Plessis won his second consecutive First Division title, despite missing the play-off matches through injury.

Super Rugby came to Port Elizabeth for the first time for the 2013 Super Rugby season and Du Plessis was named in the  wider training squad for the competition, but subsequently released to the Vodacom Cup squad. He made eight appearances for the EP Kings during the 2013 Vodacom Cup, helping them reach the semi-finals for the first time in their history.

However, a decision by the South African Rugby Union to increase the number of teams in the Premier Division in 2014 from six to eight, saw both teams promoted.

In 2014, he didn't feature in any matches during the 2014 Vodacom Cup, but he was selected in the starting line-up for the  side that faced  during a tour match during their 2014 incoming tour. He was stretchered off with a neck injury shortly before half-time as the Kings suffered a 12–34 defeat.

Retirement

He announced his retirement from rugby in March 2015, aged 27. He suffered from persistent back problems and decided to retire following medical advice to take up a role as the manager of a game reserve in Limpopo.

References

Alumni of Monument High School
South African rugby union players
Boland Cavaliers players
Eastern Province Elephants players
Southern Kings players
Falcons (rugby union) players
Golden Lions players
Living people
Rugby union players from Cape Town
1987 births
Rugby union props